Neurotransmitters are released into a synapse in packaged vesicles called quanta. One quantum generates a miniature end plate potential (MEPP) which is the smallest amount of stimulation that one neuron can send to another neuron. Quantal release is the mechanism by which most traditional endogenous neurotransmitters are transmitted throughout the body. The aggregate sum of many MEPPs is an end plate potential (EPP). A normal end plate potential usually causes the postsynaptic neuron to reach its threshold of excitation and elicit an action potential. Electrical synapses do not use quantal neurotransmitter release and instead use gap junctions between neurons to send current flows between neurons. The goal of any synapse is to produce either an excitatory postsynaptic potential (EPSP) or an inhibitory postsynaptic potential (IPSP), which generate or repress the expression, respectively, of an action potential in the postsynaptic neuron. It is estimated that an action potential will trigger the release of approximately 20% of an axon terminal's neurotransmitter load.

Quantal neurotransmitter release mechanism

Neurotransmitters are synthesized in the axon terminal where they are stored in vesicles. These neurotransmitter-filled vesicles are the quanta that will be released into the synapse. Quantal vesicles release their contents into the synapse by binding to the presynaptic membrane and combining their phospholipid bilayers. Individual quanta may randomly diffuse into the synapse and cause a subsequent MEPP. These spontaneous occurrences are completely random and are not the result of any kind of signaling pathway.

Calcium ion signaling to the axon terminal is the usual signal for presynaptic release of neurotransmitters. Calcium ion diffusion into the presynaptic membrane signals the axon terminal to release quanta to generate either an IPSP or EPSP in the postsynaptic membrane. Release of different neurotransmitters will lead to different postsynaptic potentials. Action potentials that transmit down to the axon terminal will depolarize the terminal's membrane and cause a conformational change in the membrane's calcium ion channels. These calcium channels will adopt an "open" configuration that will allow only calcium ions to enter the axon terminal. The influx of calcium ions will further depolarize the interior of the axon terminal and will signal the quanta in the axon terminal to bind to the presynaptic membrane. Once bound, the vesicles will fuse into the membrane and the neurotransmitters will be released into the membrane by exocytosis.

The exact mechanism of calcium ion signaling to the presynaptic membrane is unknown, but it has been well established that calcium ion influxes in the axon terminal are linked to neurotransmitter release. Current research suggests that neurotransmitter release into neuromuscular junctions is signaled using a hierarchy of calcium ion channels and receptors in the presynaptic membrane, with different channels and receptors showing varying degrees of excitability in the presynaptic membrane. The variety in calcium channels suggests that more efficient channels are utilized first and that differing use of calcium ion channels leads to differing levels of quantal release.

Once in the synapse, neurotransmitters will rapidly move across the synapse to attach themselves to receptors on the postsynaptic membrane. Neurotransmitter receptors will either signal postsynaptic channels to "open" or "close" which will affect the rates that ions are able to cross the synaptic membrane. The relative change in ion flow will polarize the membrane based on the properties of the affected ion channel. For example, opening a potassium ion channel in the presynaptic membrane will create a flow of positive potassium ions out of the neuron; loss of the positively charged potassium ions will cause the neuron to become more negatively charged. It is through the use of a variety of neurotransmitters and receptors that neurons are able to send a plethora of potential signals to each other. Estimations of quantal release time courses can be roughly estimated from the original quantal release events following presynaptic simulation. Such estimations cannot be reliably used in all synapses, but can be useful tools in developing the understanding of neurotransmitter release time courses in general.

Synaptic vesicle recycling

As described above, the synaptic vesicle will remain fused to the presynaptic membrane after its neurotransmitter contents have been released into the synapse. The repeated additions to the axon terminal membrane would eventually result in the uncontrolled growth of the axon terminal, which could lead to disastrous breakdown of the synaptic complex. The axon terminal compensates for this problem by reuptaking the vesicle by endocytosis and reusing its components to form new synaptic vesicles. The exact mechanism and signaling cascade which triggers synaptic vesicle recycling is still unknown.

No one method of synaptic vesicle recycling seems to hold true in all scenarios, which suggests the existence of multiple pathways for synaptic vesicle recycling. Multiple proteins have been linked with synaptic vesicle reuptake and then subsequently been linked to different synaptic vesicle recycling pathways. Clathrin-mediated endocytosis (CME) and activity-dependent bulk endocytosis (ADBE) are the two most predominant forms of synaptic vesicle recycling, with ADBE being more active during periods of high neuronal activity and CME being active for long periods of time after neuronal activity has ceased.

References

Cellular processes
Neurophysiology